The Wm. J. Cassidy Tire Building was a building at 344 N. Canal Street, Chicago, Illinois. Designed by Henry J. Schlacks and constructed in 1902, it originally served as a factory and warehouse for the Tyler & Hippach Mirror Co.

The site was purchased for redevelopment in February 2022, with demolition commencing shortly afterward. Plans are to build an apartment tower on the site.

History

The building originally stood at 117–125 N. Clinton Street. In 1907, it was sold to the Chicago and Northwestern Railroad. In 1908, the building was moved 52 feet south and 168 feet east to its current location, in order to make way for the construction of the new Chicago and North Western Terminal, at a cost of $50,000. The William Grace Company was contracted to perform the move, and hired Chicago engineer Harvey Sheeler, who had successfully moved several large buildings previously. At the time, this was the largest building ever moved.

In 1929, the Chicago and Northwestern Railroad began leasing the building to Producers Warehouse. In 1947, the building was sold to the owner of Producers Warehouse for $75,000. William J. Cassidy Tire & Auto Supply Co. purchased the building for $250,000 in 1970, and it became the headquarters of Cassidy Tire.

In 2019, The Habitat Company signed a contract to purchase the property, and intends to demolish the building and build a 33 story apartment building on the site. However, Preservation Chicago fought to have the building designated a Chicago Landmark and preserved as part of the residential development planned for the site. In February 2021, Preservation Chicago listed the Wm. J. Cassidy Tire Building as one of Chicago's most endangered buildings.

Notes

References

External Links
 Drone video tour of building before demolition.

1902 establishments in Illinois
2022 disestablishments in Illinois
Buildings and structures in Chicago
Industrial buildings completed in 1902
Chicago school architecture in Illinois
Buildings and structures demolished in 2022
Demolished buildings and structures in Chicago